Miami is a city in the U.S. state of Florida.

Miami may also refer to:

Native Americans 
 Miami Nation of Indiana, an unrecognized tribe (those exempt from forced removal)
 Miami people, a Native American ethnic group
 Miami Tribe of Oklahoma, a federally recognized tribe (those forcibly removed)

Places and geographical features

United States

Historical 
 Fort Miami (Indiana)
 Fort Miami (Michigan)
 Fort Miami (Ohio)

Populated places 
 Miami, Arizona
 Miami, Indiana
 Miami, Missouri
 Miami, New Mexico
 Miami, Ohio (disambiguation)
 Miami, Oklahoma
 Miami, Texas
 Miami, West Virginia
 Miami County (disambiguation)
 Miami Station, Missouri
 Miami Township (disambiguation)
 Florida
 Miami Beach, Florida
 Miami metropolitan area, Florida, with Miami being the largest city in the area
 Miami-Dade County, Florida

Rivers and geographical features 
 Miami River (New York)
 Miami River (Oregon)
 St. Joseph River (Lake Michigan), a river; formerly Rivière des Miamis (River of the Miamis)
 Florida
 Lake Okeechobee, Florida, once known as Mayaimi, also known as Florida's Inland Sea, a freshwater lake
 Miami Canal in Florida
 Miami River (Florida)
 Ohio
 Great Miami River, in Ohio
 Little Miami River in Ohio
 Miami Valley in Ohio

Outside the United States 
 Miami (Nea Krini), a beach in Thessaloniki, Greece
 Miami (neighborhood), in Alexandria, Egypt
 Miami, Manitoba, Canada
 Miami, Queensland, Australia
 Miami, alternate name of Meyami, Iran

Arts and entertainment

Films
 Miami (1924 film), a lost American silent film
 Miami (2017 film), a Finnish film

Albums 
 Miami (Babasónicos album), 1999
 Miami (James Gang album), 1974
 Miami (Damien Saez album), or the title song, 2013
 Miami (The Go Find album), 2004
 Miami (The Gun Club album), 1982
 Miami (Izzy Stradlin album), 2007
 M.I.A.M.I., a 2004 album by Pitbull

Songs 
 "Miami" (Counting Crows song), 2002
 "Miami" (Manuel Riva song), 2018
 "Miami" (Will Smith song), 1998
 "Miami" (Nicki Minaj song), 2018
 "Miami", by John Mellencamp from John Cougar, 1979
 "Miami", by Randy Newman from Trouble in Paradise, 1983
 "Miami", by Bob Seger and the Silver Bullet Band from Like a Rock, 1986
 "Miami", by U2 from Pop, 1997
 "Miami", by Against Me! from Searching for a Former Clarity, 2005
 "Miami", by Taking Back Sunday from Louder Now, 2006
 "Miami", by Foals from Total Life Forever, 2010
 "Miami", by Kali Uchis featuring Bia from Isolation, 2018
 "Miami", by Tory Lanez featuring Gunna from Love Me Now?, 2018
 "Miami 2017 (Seen the Lights Go Out on Broadway)", by Billy Joel

Other uses in arts and entertainment
 Miami (book), a 1987 book by Joan Didion
 The Miami Showband, an Irish group from the 1960s onwards, sometimes billed simply as Miami

Schools
 Miami University, Oxford, Ohio
 University of Miami, Coral Gables, Florida
 Miami International University of Art & Design, Florida
 Miami High School (disambiguation)

Sports
 Miami Hurricanes, the athletic program of the University of Miami in the U.S. state of Florida
 Miami RedHawks, the athletic program of Miami University in the U.S. state of Ohio
 Huntington Miamis, a minor league baseball team

Transportation 
 Miami (Amtrak station), a train station in the U.S. city of Miami, Florida
 City of Miami (train), a seven-car coach streamliner in use from 1940 to 1971
 Miami Intermodal Center, an intermodal transit station serving the Miami, Florida, metropolitan area in the United States
 Miami International Airport, which serves the Miami, Florida, metropolitan area
 Miami Metrorail, a rapid transit system serving the Miami, Florida, metropolitan area
 Miami-Dade Transit, the public transit authority of the Miami, Florida, metropolitan area

Other uses
 USS Miami (SSN-755), a decommissioned nuclear attack submarine
 Miami (soil), a soil series
 Miami, an Internet TCP/IP stack program for Amiga
 "Miami", nickname of Jim Beach (born 1942),  British lawyer and longtime manager of the rock band Queen
 Miami Trip, a type of amusement ride.

See also 

 Miami-Illinois language, the language spoken by the Miami tribe
 Maimi Yajima (born 1992), Japanese singer
 Mayaimi, a Native American people who lived around Lake Okeechobee
 Miami airport (disambiguation)
 Port Miami (disambiguation)
 Fort Miami (disambiguation)